Tina Holmes (born in New York City) is an American television and film actress, known for appearing as Maggie Sibley in Six Feet Under.

Early years and education 
Holmes grew up in New York City and Connecticut. She attended Yale University for two years followed by a move to Paris, France, studying French Literature at the Sorbonne. After returning to the U.S., Holmes entered Brown University where she earned her Bachelor of Arts degree in Comparative Literature. After graduating from Brown, Holmes returned to Paris to serve as a research assistant on a documentary on famed novelist, poet and playwright Jean Genet. She also spent time at the Federal University of Pernambuco in Brazil.

Film and production 
Holmes has traveled, studied, and researched foreign language and documentary film. She has studied Brazilian literature and culture and was an intern at the production company, Good Machine. She then worked for photographer Bruce Weber as a production manager on his documentary on actor Robert Mitchum, she assisted documentary filmmaker Dr. Shirley Sun on her film about General Joseph Stilwell, traveling to Hong Kong, Beijing, Malaysia and Singapore for research.

Voidstrutter, Holmes' music video company, has produced music videos for Aphex Twin, Blonde Redhead and Pavement.

Holmes taught video at Sidewalks of New York, an after-school program for children in homeless shelters. Holmes produced and directed the documentary short film You're Nobody Until Somebody Loves You, in which women in their 80s and 90s shared their experiences and offered advice on love. After directing and production work, Holmes decided to begin her acting career.

Acting career 
Holmes began her film acting career with 1998's Edge of Seventeen, playing the starring role of Maggie. She followed that with roles in the movies 30 Days in 1999; The Photographer and Prince of Central Park in 2000; Seven and a Match in 2003; Pretty Persuasion in 2005; Half Nelson in 2006; and Shelter in 2007.

Holmes has also been featured in several television series such as Grey's Anatomy (Season 3 Episode 4; "What I Am"), 24, Law & Order: Special Victims Unit, "NYPD Blue" (episode: "It's to Die For, 11/04/2003"), Invasion, CSI: Crime Scene Investigation, Third Watch, Criminal Minds, Cold Case (episode: "Dog Day Afternoons"), Prison Break how Kristine Kellerman, sister of Paul Kellerman  and in a recurring role as Maggie Sibley on the HBO original series Six Feet Under during the fourth and fifth seasons.

She portrayed Moira on NBC's Persons Unknown before it was cancelled.

She appeared as a waitress/patient named Nadia on the February 14, 2011 episode of House, entitled "You Must Remember This".

She appeared as Laurel, an expectant mother carrying twins, on the February 23, 2012, episode of Private Practice, entitled "Andromeda".

References

External links
 

Actresses from New York City
American film actresses
American television actresses
Brown University alumni
Living people
University of Paris alumni
Yale University alumni
20th-century American actresses
21st-century American actresses
Year of birth missing (living people)